René Wagner (born 31 October 1972) is a Czech football manager and former player.

Born in Brno, Wagner played in his career mostly for FC Zbrojovka Brno and SK Rapid Wien in Austria. In April 2011 he was named the manager of FC Zbrojovka Brno, replacing previous coach Karel Večeřa. After winning just two games of sixteen games in charge, Wagner was dismissed in October 2011.

Wagner was named the manager of SC Wiener Neustadt in April 2016.

References

External links
 
  Profile at FC Zbrojovka Brno official website
 Profile at Rapidarchiv.at

1972 births
Living people
Footballers from Brno
Czech footballers
Association football forwards
Czech Republic international footballers
Czech First League players
Austrian Football Bundesliga players
SK Rapid Wien players
FC Zbrojovka Brno players
SV Mattersburg players
Czech expatriate footballers
Expatriate footballers in Austria
Czech football managers
Czech First League managers
FC Zbrojovka Brno managers
SC Wiener Neustadt managers
Czech expatriate sportspeople in Austria
Expatriate football managers in Austria